John Allen Nicholas (2 May 1930 – 1966) was an Australian ice hockey player. He competed in the men's tournament at the 1960 Winter Olympics.

References

External links
 John Nicholas at Hockey-Reference.com
 John Allen Nicholas at IceLegendsAustralia.com
 
 

1930 births
1966 deaths
Australian ice hockey players
Olympic ice hockey players of Australia
Ice hockey players at the 1960 Winter Olympics
Sportspeople from Melbourne